The 39th New Zealand Parliament was a term of the Parliament of New Zealand which began with the general election held on 25 November 1978, and finished with the general election held on 28 November 1981. The dates of the Muldoon Ministry were from 13 December 1978 to 11 December 1981.

The Prime Minister, Robert Muldoon of the National Party, led the Third National Government from 1975 to 1984.

Overview of seats
The table below shows the number of MPs in each party following the 1978 election and at dissolution:

Notes
The Working Government majority is calculated as all Government MPs less all other parties.

Initial composition of the 39th Parliament

By-elections during 39th Parliament
There were a number of changes during the term of the 39th Parliament.

Summary of changes during term
Bruce Barclay, the Labour MP for Christchurch Central, died in 1979. The ensuing by-election was won by Geoffrey Palmer, also of the Labour Party.
Matiu Rata, a Labour cabinet minister, resigned from his party in 1979 due to disagreements with its policy towards Māori. In 1980, Rata quit parliament and founded the Mana Motuhake party. Rata then contested the ensuing by-election, but came second. He was replaced by Bruce Gregory of the Labour Party.
Frank Rogers, the Labour MP for Onehunga, died in 1980. The ensuing by-election was won by Fred Gerbic, also of the Labour Party.
Frank Gill, the National MP for East Coast Bays, resigned from parliament in 1980 in order to take up a position as New Zealand's ambassador in Washington. The ensuing by-election was won, much to the National Party's surprise, by Gary Knapp of the Social Credit Party.

Notes

References

New Zealand parliaments